The Arab Super Cup was an Arab football competition, held between four teams (the winners and runners-up of both the Arab Club Champions Cup and the Arab Cup Winners' Cup) each year.

History
The Arab Super Cup started in 1992 with an unofficial edition in Casablanca, Morocco, and was discontinued after the 2001 edition held in Damascus, Syria.

Records and statistics

Finals

Notes

 A round-robin tournament determined the final standings.

Winners by club

Winners by country

All-time top scorers

External links
RSSSF

 

Union of Arab Football Associations club competitions
Defunct international club association football competitions in Africa
Recurring sporting events established in 1992
Recurring events disestablished in 2001
 
Union of Arab Football Associations competitions